Summer is one of the four seasons.

Summer or The Summer may also refer to:

Film
 Summer (1930 film), an animated cartoon by Ub Iwerks
 Summer (1976 film), an Estonian-Russian film by Arvo Kruusement
 Summer (1986 film) or The Green Ray, a film by Eric Rohmer
 Summer (2008 film), an independent UK film by Kenny Glenaan
 Summer (2011 film), a Chilean film by José Luis Torres Leiva
 Summer (2018 film), a Russian film

Literature
 Summer (Wharton novel), a 1917 novel by Edith Wharton
 Summer, a 2020 novel by Ali Smith
 Summer (L'Été), a 1954 essay by Albert Camus

Music

Albums
 Summer (George Winston album), 2008
 Summer (Harisu album), 2006
 Summer (Summer Watson album), 2003
 Summer, by Zhou Xun, 2003

EPs
 Summer (Boyfriend EP), 2017
 Summer (Cassadee Pope EP), 2016
 Summer (Jon Foreman EP), 2008
 Summer (Subtle EP), 2001
 Summer (Tohoshinki EP), 2007
 Summer EP (Hawk Nelson EP), 2009
 Summer EP (Sherwood EP), 2006
 Sum(me:r), a 2019 EP by Pentagon
 The Summer (EP), a 2009 EP by Never Shout Never

Songs
 "Summer" (Mogwai composition), 1997
 "Summer" (Calvin Harris song), 2014
 "Summer" (Cassadee Pope song), 2016
 "Summer" (Dragon song), 1989
 "Summer" (Shy Child song), 2007
 "Summer" (War song), 1976
 "The Summer" (ATB song), 2000
 "The Summer" (Josh Pyke song), 2009
 "Summer (The First Time)", by Bobby Goldsboro, 1973
 "Summer" ("L'estate"), the second concerto in Vivaldi's The Four Seasons
 "Summer", by Alien Ant Farm from Anthology
 "Summer", by Beatsteaks from Living Targets
 "Summer", by Brockhampton from Saturation II
 "Summer", by the Carters from Everything Is Love, 2018 
 "Summer", by Charlotte Hatherley from Grey Will Fade
 "Summer", by Dido from Safe Trip Home
 "Summer", by Fireworks from Gospel
 "Summer", by Imagine Dragons from Smoke + Mirrors
 "Summer", by Joe Hisaishi from the soundtrack of Kikujiro
 "Summer", by Marsheaux from Lumineux Noir
 "Summer", by Marshmello from Joytime
 "Summer", by Moby from Play: The B Sides
 "Summer", by Modest Mouse from The Fruit That Ate Itself
 "Summer", by Modestep
 "Summer", by Parah Dice, 2019
 "Summer", by Smashing Pumpkins from the single "Perfect"
 "Summer", by Sum 41 from Half Hour of Power and All Killer No Filler
 "Summer!", by twlv, Superbee, Uneducated Kid, and Yuzion

Paintings
 Summer (Claus), an 1893 painting by Emile Claus
 Summer (Goya), a 1786–87 painting by Francisco de Goya
 Summer, a 1572 painting by Giuseppe Arcimboldo

Video games
 _Summer (visual novel), by Hooksoft (2005)
 "Summer", a story arc in the visual novel Air (2000)

Companies
 The Summer Company, an American theatre company based in Pittsburgh
 Virgil C. Summer Nuclear Generating Station, a facility in South Carolina, USA

People
 Summer (given name), an English feminine first name, including a list of people with the name
 Summer (surname), a family name, including a list of people with the name

 Summer XO (born 1982), American singer and visual artist known as Summer before 2013

Other uses
 Adder (electronics) or summer, a circuit that sums numbers
 Bressummer or summer, a beam used in building construction
 Season of Summer (liturgy), a period in the East Syriac liturgical year

See also 
 
 :Category:Summer
 Sommer (means 'summer' in some Germanic languages), a surname 
 Sumer, an ancient civilisation in Mesopotamia
 Summerland (disambiguation)
 Summers (disambiguation)
 Summertime (disambiguation)
 Sumner (disambiguation)